Humber River Hospital is a major acute care hospital in Toronto, Ontario, Canada, located in the northwest part of Toronto, near Highway 401 and Keele Street. It is a large community hospital offering emergency and intensive care services, maternal and child services along with other services such as cardiology, orthopaedic surgery and cancer care. In the 2019-2020 fiscal year there were nearly 30,000 inpatient stays with an average length of stay of 7.0 days, and 135,000 emergency department visits.

History
Humber River Hospital is the merged facility of three previous hospitals: Humber Memorial Hospital on Church Street in the former town of Weston, the York-Finch Hospital and the Northwestern General Hospital. The three hospitals were part of the Humber River Regional Hospital health network.

Construction on the  facility began in October 2011 on the site of a former Ministry of Transportation of Ontario parking lot on Keele Street north of the 401 highway. The Plenary Health Care Partnerships consortium was the builder of the hospital.  The new hospital was designed by HDR Architects, engineered by WSP and built by PCL. The new hospital opened in 2015.

Ambulatory and Urgent Care services remained open at the York-Finch site, and the Humber Memorial site re-opened in 2016 to provide dialysis, out-patient physiotherapy and the Community Care Access Centre (CCAC) wound and skin clinic on a temporary basis. The Finch and Church sites are known as the "Reactivation Centres (RCC)". Both RCCs contain Reactivation Care Units for multiple  hospitals in the GTA. Both RCCs are also currently home to COVID-19 assessment centres. The Keele Street site was sold to the Daniels Corporation developer, which plans to build a new neighbourhood on the site.

Part of the hospital's mission is to be innovative. In 2017, the hospital opened its "Command Centre" that was built in collaboration with GE Healthcare. It includes a Wall of Analytics to improve efficiency throughout the hospital and improve wait times and other issues. The hospital is North America's first fully digital hospital.
the CEO is Barbara Collins

Programs and services

The hospital is affiliated with the University of Toronto and Queen's University.

 cancer care
 emergency department
 intensive care unit
 laboratory services
 maternity
 medical imaging
 mental health and addictions program
 nephrology program - at Wilson Avenue and Church Street sites
 surgical program

Source: Humber River Hospital

References

External links
 Official website

Hospitals established in 1997
Hospitals in Toronto
North York
Hospitals affiliated with the University of Toronto
1997 establishments in Ontario